The Higginson Lecture is an annual lecture organised by and held at Durham University. The series was set up in recognition of Sir Gordon Higginson. Each year a leading engineer is selected to make a presentation, from their own perspective, on a topical issue in engineering.

Higginson gave the inaugural lecture himself in 1997. He then attended all of the lectures until 2009, 2 years before his death.

Lecturers

 1997 Gordon Higginson
 1998 Robert Hawley
 1999 Richard Hornby
 2000 Ian Fells
 2001 Kevin Warwick
 2002 John Burland
 2003 Mike Sterling
 2004 Nick Cumpsty
 2005 Heinz Wolff
 2006 Julia King
 2007 Nick Cooper
 2008 Roderick Smith
 2009 Peter Head
 2010 Michael Robinson
 2011 Roger Owen
 2013 Warren East
 2014 Paul Hawkins
 2015 Duncan Dowson
 2016 Rob Pieke
 2017 Naomi Climer
 2018 Ann Dowling
 2019 Anthony Unsworth
 2022 Paul Marsden

References 

Awards established in 1997
British lecture series
British science and technology awards
Durham University
Engineering education in the United Kingdom
Science lecture series